Stalać is a village located in the municipality of Ćićevac, Serbia. According to the 2011 census, the village has a population of 1,521 inhabitants.

Features
Stalać lies at the banks of South Morava, near its confluence with West Morava into Great Morava. It is an important railway junction, where a westbound railway to Kraljevo splits from the main Belgrade-Niš Railway on the Pan-European Corridor X.

One of the village landmarks is the Stalać Fortress, a Monument of Culture of Great Importance for the Republic of Serbia.

References

Populated places in Rasina District